The Afghan Cheetahs was a Twenty20 team established in 2011 from Afghanistan that played in Pakistan's domestic Faysal Bank Twenty-20 Cup in September/October 2011.  The team was captained by Mohammad Nabi and coached by Raees Ahmadzai.

Background
Despite the Afghanistan national cricket team being a member of the International Cricket Council in its own right, its recent success has seen it invited to take part in this competition in its full member neighbour.  This is similar to other associate/affiliate members of the International Cricket Council.  In Europe, the national teams of Denmark, Ireland, the Netherlands and Scotland have all at some point taken part in English domestic cricket.  In Africa, Kenya has taken part in West Indian and Zimbabwean domestic cricket, while Namibia takes part in South Africa domestic cricket.  Similarly, the national teams of Canada and the United States have also been invited to take part in West Indian domestic cricket.  Such moves are seen as a way to give associate/affiliate members of the International Cricket Council access to regular cricket of a high standard, which they do not have access to in their own countries, by which to improve their skills.

Fixtures and results
Compiling a mixture of national players and youth, the Afghan Cheetahs played three matches in the competition, losing all three.  They lost to Rawalpindi Rams by 4 wickets, Faisalabad Wolves by 13 runs and Multan Tigers by 4 wickets.  These defeats left the Cheetahs at the bottom of their group and eliminated them from the competition.

Scorecards
The following scorecards are the Afghan Cheetahs' results from their three matches in the Faysal Bank Twenty-20 Cup 2011–12:

See also
 Asiatic cheetah, the animal which used to occur in Afghanistan

References

External links
Afghanistan Cricket Board
Cricketarchive page for Afghan Cheetahs
Twenty 20 record page for Afghan Cheetahs

Afghan cricket tours of Pakistan
Cricket clubs established in 2011
Cricket teams in Pakistan
Cheetahs